In mathematics, the continuous q-Jacobi polynomials P(x|q),  introduced by , are a family of basic hypergeometric orthogonal polynomials in the basic Askey scheme.  give a detailed list of their properties.

Definition

The  polynomials are given in terms of basic hypergeometric functions and the q-Pochhammer symbol by

References

Orthogonal polynomials
Q-analogs
Special hypergeometric functions